Teresa Hurtado de Ory (born May 6, 1983 in  Seville, Andalucía, Spain) is a Spanish actress.

Filmography 
No me pidas que te bese porque te besaré (2007)
Va ser que nadie es perfecto (2006) aka Nobody Is Perfect
Ilusiones rotas-11M (2005)
Coolness (2004)
Astronautas (2003)
Television 
 Cuenta atrás (2007–2008) as Rocío.
 El Caso. Crónica de sucesos (2016) as Paloma García.

References

External links 
 

1983 births
Living people
People from Seville
Spanish film actresses
21st-century Spanish actresses
Actresses from Andalusia
Spanish television actresses